Lewis Branscomb may refer to:
 Lewis M. Branscomb (born 1926), American physicist, government policy advisor, and corporate research manager
 Lewis C. Branscomb (1865–1930), American Methodist minister in Alabama